Too Many Times may refer to:

 "Too Many Times", by Mental As Anything
 "Too Many Times" (Sister2Sister song)
 "Too Many Times" (Earl Thomas Conley and Anita Pointer song)
 "Too Many Times", a single by Kai Tracid, 2001